The women's football tournament at the 1998 Goodwill Games was held from 25 to 27 July 1998. The four national teams involved in the tournament were required to register a squad of players, including two goalkeepers.

The age listed for each player is their age as of 25 July 1998, the first day of the tournament. The numbers of caps and goals listed for each player do not include any matches played after the start of the tournament. The club listed is the club for which the player last played a competitive match prior to the tournament.

China PR
Manager: Ma Yuanan

China PR named a 19-player squad for the tournament.

Denmark
Manager: Jørgen Hvidemose

Denmark named an 18-player squad for the tournament.

Norway
Manager: Per-Mathias Høgmo

Norway named a 17-player squad for the tournament.

United States
Manager: Tony DiCicco

The United States named an 18-player squad for the tournament.

References

Football squads
1998 squads
Association football women's tournament squads